The 1979 RAC Tricentrol British Saloon Car Championship was the 22nd season of the championship. Richard Longman successfully defended his drivers title with his Mini 1275 GT.

Calendar & Winners
All races were held in the United Kingdom. Overall winners in bold.

Night race.

Championship results

References

British Touring Car Championship seasons
Saloon